Several dynasties named "Chalukya" ruled in present-day India at various times. The oldest of these were the Chalukyas of Vatapi or Badami (c. 6th-8th century CE). Other Chalukya dynasties include:

 Chalukyas of Navasarika (c. 7th-8th century CE), vassals of the Vatapi Chalukyas; also known as the early Chalukyas of Gujarat
 Chalukyas of Vemulavada (c. 7th-10th century CE), vassals of the Rashtrakutas
 Chalukyas of Vengi (c. 7th-12th century CE), also known as the Eastern Chalukyas
 Chalukyas of Kalyani (c. 10th-12th century CE), also known as the Western Chalukyas
 Chalukya–Chola wars
 Chalukyas of Gujarat (c. 10th-13th century CE); used the self-designation Chaulukya; also known as Solankis
 Chalukyas of Lata (c. 10th-11th century CE); ruled southern Gujarat as vassals of other dynasties, including the Kalyani Chalukyas
 Chalukya Shiva Temple, Hindu temple in Karnataka, India; built by the Chalukyas of Vatapi
 Dadar Central–Tirunelveli Chalukya Express, passenger train in India

See also
Solanki (disambiguation)